Jeff Barker (born 1943) is an American politician and law enforcement officer who served as a member of the Oregon House of Representatives, for the 28th district from 2003 until his retirement in 2021.

Early life and education
Barker was born in 1943 in Portland, Oregon and his home city is in Aloha, Oregon. Barker received a Bachelor of Science degree from Portland State University.

Career

Prior to running for the Oregon State Legislature, Barker served as an enlisted man in the United States Marines, and later an Oregon State Trooper. He entered the Portland Police Bureau as an officer, before making detective, and eventually reaching the rank of Lieutenant.

He led the Portland Police Association in 1995–1996, describing the its power as "Chiefs come and go like itinerant laborers, but the union is always there."

His support and advocacy in animal-related measures saw him labeled as a 2011 "Top Dog" by the Oregon Humane Society.

Current legislative committees
Barker has been a member of the following legislative committees:
 Judiciary, Chair
 Public Safety Subcommittee, Vice Chair
 Member, Ways and Means Committee
 Veteran's Committee, Chair
 Member, PERS Reform Committee (2003)
 Member, Health Committee

Professional experience
Barker has had the following professional experience:
 Police lieutenant, Portland Police Bureau, retired
 Trooper, Oregon State Police
 United States Marine Corps 1961–1964, enlisted

References

External links
 Oregon State House - Jeff Barker official government website
 Project Vote Smart - Representative Jeff Barker (OR) profile
 Follow the Money - Jeff Barker
 2006 2004 2002 campaign contributions

1943 births
Living people
Members of the Oregon House of Representatives
Portland State University alumni
People from Aloha, Oregon
Portland Police Bureau officers
21st-century American politicians
Politicians from Portland, Oregon